Sailing at the 2012 Summer Paralympics in London was held from August in Weymouth and Portland. XYZ competitors representing XYZ countries will compete in three keelboat classes - the 2.4mR, the SKUD 18, and the Sonar, took part in sailing in the 2008 Summer Paralympics.

Competitors had a wide range of physical disabilities including degenerative nerve disease, blindness, missing limbs and polio.

Boats were prepared and launched from the docks of the Weymouth and Portland Sailing Academy.

Events
Three sailing events were held. All were mixed events, meaning that men and women could compete together.

International disability classification in sailing is done by a committee, which gives each competitor a number score with lower numbers corresponding to more severe disability. Sailors were classified under the IFDS Functional Classification System. To take part in Paralympic sailing, an athlete must have a score of 7 or less.

The 2-person keelboat (SKUD18) was the only Paralympic class keelboat with a spinnaker, emblazoned with the national flag of each country. Of the 11 countries competing in the SKUD event, all had a female competitor with a disability.

Results

Medal table
This ranking sorts countries by the number of gold medals earned by their sailors (in this context a country is an entity represented by a National Paralympic Committee. The number of silver medals is taken into consideration next and then the number of bronze medals. If, after the above, countries are still tied, equal ranking is given and they are listed alphabetically.

One Person Keelboat - 2.4 Metre

16 boats are to take part in the 2.4MR class.

Two Person Keelboat - SKUD 18

Open Three-Person Keelboat - Sonar

References

External links
Official site of the 2012 Summer Paralympics
IFDS - International Association for Disabled Sailing
ISAF - International Sailing Federation

 
2012 Summer Paralympics events
Paralympics
Sailing competitions in the United Kingdom